The 2018 Akron Zips football team represented the University of Akron in the 2018 NCAA Division I FBS football season. They were led by seventh-year head coach Terry Bowden and played their home games at InfoCision Stadium–Summa Field in Akron, Ohio as members of the East Division of the Mid-American Conference. They finished the season 4–8, 2–6 in MAC play to finish in a tie for fourth place in the East Division.

On December 2, Akron fired head coach Terry Bowden. He finished at Akron with a seven-year record of 35–52. On December 14, the school hired Chattanooga head coach Tom Arth for the head coaching job.

Previous season

The Zips finished the 2017 season 7–7, 6–2 in MAC play to win the East Division. They lost to Toledo in the MAC Championship. They received an invitation to play in the Boca Raton Bowl where they lost to Florida Atlantic.

Preseason

Award watch lists
Listed in the order that they were released

Preseason media poll
The MAC released their preseason media poll on July 24, 2018, with the Zips predicted to finish in fourth place in the East Division.

Schedule

The game between Akron and Nebraska, originally scheduled for September 1, 2018, was canceled due to inclement weather. The Zips agreed to schedule South Carolina, who also canceled a game earlier in the year due to Hurricane Florence.
 Source:

Game summaries

Morgan State

at Northwestern

at Iowa State

Miami (OH)

at Buffalo

at Kent State

Central Michigan

Northern Illinois

at Eastern Michigan

Bowling Green

at Ohio

at South Carolina

Players drafted into the NFL

References

Akron
Akron Zips football seasons
Akron Zips football